Christopher Ward Norman (born 25 October 1950) is an English soft rock singer. Norman was the original lead singer of the English rock band Smokie, (1964–1986), who found success in Europe in the 1970s. "Stumblin' In", a 1978 duet with Suzi Quatro, was a big US hit.

Life and career

With the advent of rock and roll, Norman acquired his first guitar at the age of seven. His early musical influences were Elvis Presley, Little Richard, Otis Redding, and Lonnie Donegan.

In these early years, Norman's parents moved around the country a lot, which resulted in him going to nine different schools, and living in various locations around England, such as Redcar, Luton, Kimpton, and Nottingham. By 1962, however, the family had moved back to Norman's mother's home city of Bradford. Approaching his twelfth birthday, Norman started at St. Bede's Grammar School, where he was to meet Alan Silson and Terry Uttley, future members of Smokie.

As teenagers, influenced by the new era of groups such as The Beatles and The Rolling Stones and then folk singer, Bob Dylan, Norman and Silson began meeting up and spent nearly all their spare time learning new songs on their guitars. They managed to persuade Uttley to join them and, along with a drummer friend called Ron Kelly, they formed their first band. The Yen, Essence, and Long Side Down were just some of a variety of names they called themselves before settling on "The Elizabethans". When Ron Kelly left the group in 1973, an old friend called Pete Spencer was asked to take over on the drums, and the group, which was to become Smokie, was complete.

In 1970, Norman married his wife Linda, and they have five children together. Since 1986, they have resided on the Isle of Man.

Between 1974 and the early 1980s, Smokie enjoyed success touring all over the world, but the strain and pressure of constantly being away from home and family was beginning to tell on Norman. By the early 1980s he decided to spend more time writing and working in the studio. Norman and Spencer now worked together on songs for other artists including hits for Kevin Keegan ("Head Over Heels in Love", a No. 31 UK hit), and the England football team song "This Time (We'll Get It Right)". He also worked with Agnetha Fältskog (on her solo album), Racey (co-writer of "Baby It's You"), Donovan (backing vocals on Donovan), and Heavy Metal Kids.

In 1978, Norman recorded a duet with Suzi Quatro, "Stumblin' In", which made No. 4 on the US Billboard Hot 100 and sold over one million copies.

Norman's solo career took off in 1986 with the song, "Midnight Lady", which was a hit throughout Europe holding the number one spot in Germany for six weeks (where it sold 900,000 copies). Further success followed by the songs "Some Hearts Are Diamonds", "No Arms Can Ever Hold You", "Broken Heroes", "Fearless Hearts", "Sarah" and "Baby I Miss You". In 1994, Norman was honoured by CMT Europe as their 'International Video Star of the Year'.

In 2004, he took part in the Comeback Show on the German TV station ProSieben and he performed "Stumblin' In" as a duet with C. C. Catch. In the final episode of the show, he was joined by Smokie for the final song.

On 2 June 2007, Norman performed at the Peel Bay Festival, Isle of Man.

Discography

Awards
 Löwe von Radio Luxemburg Silver Award 
 Goldene Europa  
 Bravo Otto - Best Male Singer (Bronze) 
 CMT Europe International Video Star of the Year  
 Gala zur Verleihung des Internationalen Schlagerpreises  
 Radio Regenbogen Award

References

External links

1950 births
Living people
20th-century English singers
21st-century English singers
English male singers
English rock singers
English pop singers
English rock guitarists
English songwriters
British soft rock musicians
Rhythm guitarists
Musicians from Bradford
People from Redcar
Hansa Records artists
Sony BMG artists
Rak Records artists
Polydor Records artists
20th-century British guitarists
21st-century British guitarists
English male guitarists
20th-century British male singers
21st-century British male singers
British male songwriters